Souk El Nissa (English: Women market) is one of the souks of the medina of Tunis.

Location 
This market is located in the heart of the medina, at the south of Al-Zaytuna Mosque, near the souk of wool.

History 
The name of this market comes from the fact that women came there for buying and selling some products, like traditional feminine clothes, lace, hijab, etc.

Nowadays, the market isn't specialized in this type of product anymore.

References 

Nissa